Lachaussée is a commune in the Meuse department in Grand Est in north-eastern France.

Geography 

The village of Lachaussée lies on the south-eastern rim of a huge pond named Étang de Lachaussée, which was created during the middle ages  from a marsh area and then devoted to pisciculture.

See also
Communes of the Meuse department
Parc naturel régional de Lorraine

References

Communes of Meuse (department)